Al Majma'ah Sports City (formerly known as King Salman Bin Abdulaziz Sport City Stadium) is a multi-purpose stadium in Al Majma'ah, Saudi Arabia. It is currently used mostly for football matches and is the home stadium of Al-Faisaly, Al-Fayha and Al-Mujazzal. The stadium has a seating capacity of 7,000.

The stadium was previously known as the King Salman Bin Abdulaziz Sport City Stadium and was named after King Salman of Saudi Arabia. On 29 May 2019, the stadium's name was changed to Al Majma'ah Sports City.

See also
 List of things named after Saudi kings

References

External links
Stadium information
goalzz

Football venues in Saudi Arabia
Multi-purpose stadiums in Saudi Arabia
Al-Fayha FC